Gregory Caldwell Davison (August 12, 1871 – May 7, 1935) was a naval officer, inventor and a Vice President of the Electric Boat Company in Groton, Connecticut.

Biography
Davison was born August 12, 1871 in Jefferson City, Missouri, the son of Alexander Caldwell and Sarah Caroline Pelot Davison. He graduated from the United States Naval Academy on 27 May 1892. He served in many ships, specializing in torpedo boat operations. until resigning in 1908.

An excellent scientist as well as an efficient naval officer, Lieutenant Commander Davison was responsible for many inventions in ordnance, torpedoes, submarines and general naval science. Retiring from the Navy on December 31, 1907, he later became Vice President of the Electric Boat Company, continuing his interest in and support of the Navy until his death on May 7, 1935.

Marriage
On April 11, 1898, he married Alice Shepard, the daughter of Rear Admiral Edwin M. Shepard.

Namesake
In 1942, the destroyer  (DD-618) was named in honor of Lieutenant Commander Davison. His widow, Alice Davison, was the ship's sponsor.

See also
Bliss-Leavitt torpedo
Bliss-Leavitt Mark 2 torpedo
USS D-3 (SS-19)

References

1871 births
1935 deaths
United States Navy officers
United States Naval Academy alumni